Fulvoclysia is a genus of moths belonging to the family Tortricidae.

Species
Fulvoclysia albertii Razowski, 1983
Fulvoclysia arguta Razowski, 1968
Fulvoclysia aulica Razowski, 1968 
Fulvoclysia defectana (Lederer, 1870)
Fulvoclysia dictyodana (Staudinger, 1880)
Fulvoclysia forsteri (Osthelder, 1938)
Fulvoclysia nerminae Kocak, 1982
Fulvoclysia pallorana (Lederer, 1864)
Fulvoclysia proxima Razowski, 1970
Fulvoclysia rjabovi Kuznetzov, 1976
Fulvoclysia subdolana (Kennel, 1901)

See also
List of Tortricidae genera

References

 , 1943, Z. Wien. ent. Ges. 28: 44
 ,2005 World Catalogue of Insects, 6
 , 2011: Diagnoses and remarks on genera of Tortricidae, 2: Cochylini (Lepidoptera: Tortricidae). Shilap Revista de Lepidopterologia 39 (156): 397–414.

External links
tortricidae.com

Cochylini
Tortricidae genera